Suftu, also known as Melka Suftu or Melka Softu, is a town in the Liben Zone of Ethiopia. It is located near the border with southern Somalia and the Mandera County in Kenya. Other towns in Liben Zone include Dolo and Sathe.

Demographics
Suftu is one of three towns in the Dolo Odo woreda border to Mandera County. Based on figures from the Central Statistical Agency in 2006, this town had an estimated total population of 25,059, of whom 13,366 are men and 11,693 are women.  The population has increased since 1997 when it was reported to be 16,801, of whom 8,830 were men and 7,971 women. According to Chatham House, Suftu is  inhabited by Somalis From the Darood Marehan tribe.

Economy
Suftu's principal economic activity is pastoralism. Chatham House notes that the town lies along major trading routes in Ethiopia used by Somali livestock merchants, which lead from the western and north-western parts of the country to Mandera in the North Eastern Province of Kenya.

Education
As of November 2013, elementary education in Suftu is served by the Suftu Primary School.

Transportation
Suftu has its own airport, which has a dirt landing area.

Climate
Suftu has a dry climate. It is categorized as semi-arid under the Köppen climate classification (BSh). Temperatures tend to be hot throughout the year.

Notes

References
Melka Suftu: Ethiopia

Populated places in the Somali Region
Populated places in Liben Zone